Dora Werzberg Amelan (5 September 1920 – 1 April 2020) was a French nurse and social worker. In 1942, she rescued Jewish children through Œuvre de secours aux enfants (OSE). She worked in the Camp de Rivesaltes and the Gurs internment camp, and took care of children who had survived the Nazi concentration camps. She died during the COVID-19 pandemic due to complications brought on by COVID-19.

Biography
Werzberg was born in Strasbourg, the daughter of Karl Werzberg and Gisèla Blum, who were Jewish emigrants from Poland. The family moved to Antwerp when Werzberg was ten, and stayed until the death of her mother and the invasion of Belgium by Nazi Germany. She then joined a Zionist youth movement.

Werzberg had two sisters, Manda, who died of sepsis in 1942, and Simone Ben David, who died in Israel at age 86. Her cousins included Georges Loinger and Marcel Marceau. Werzberg went to the German Kommandantur to obtain papers to flee to the south of France. Her father was unable to obtain the papers, but fled to the Zone libre illegally. There, the Werzbergs settled in Limoges, where her extended family was located.

Werzberg worked for the OSE, the Camp de Rivesaltes, and, lastly, the Gurs internment camp until its closure in November 1943.

Distinction
Knight of the Legion of Honour (2016)

References

1920 births
2020 deaths
People from Strasbourg
Deaths from the COVID-19 pandemic in France
20th-century French Jews
French nurses
French women nurses
French people of Polish-Jewish descent
Gurs internment camp survivors